Fahrudin Jusufi (8 December 1939 – 9 August 2019) was a Yugoslav footballer who most notably played for Partizan, Eintracht Frankfurt and the Yugoslav national team.

Playing career

Club career
Jusufi was born into an ethnic Gorani family in the village of Zli Potok near Dragaš (Vardar Banovina, Kingdom of Yugoslavia, present-day Serbia). During his career, he played for FK Partizan, Eintracht Frankfurt, Germania Wiesbaden and FC Dornbirn, retiring in 1972. He was part of the Partizan squad when they became vice-champions of Europe after losing the 1966 European Cup Final against Real Madrid.

International career
On the national level, Jusufi played for Yugoslavia (55 matches), and was a participant at the 1962 FIFA World Cup and at the 1960 Summer Olympics, where his team won the gold medal.

Coaching career
After retiring, Jusufi went into coaching, mainly in West Germany with SG Wattenscheid 09 in the second division, but also in 1987–88 at the helm of Partizan.

He also coached Schalke 04, 1860 Munich and lastly Čelik Zenica.

Personal life and death
In a 1991 interview for Serbian bi-weekly Tempo, Jusufi was asked if he is "experiencing any problems in regards to the current political situation" and "due to his ethnicity." Jusufi replied, "Why would I be experiencing any problems? I'm a Gorani, if that even interests anyone."

His son Sascha was also a professional footballer.

Jusufi died on 9 August 2019 at the age of 79 in Hamburg, Germany.

Honours

Player
Partizan
Yugoslav First League: 1960–61, 1961–62, 1962–63, 1964–65

Eintracht Frankfurt
UEFA Intertoto Cup: 1966–67

Yugoslavia
1960 European Nations' Cup: Runner-up
1960 Summer Olympics: Gold medal

Individual
Awards
World Soccer World XI: 1962, 1963, 1968

References

External links

Fahrudin Jusufi at Eintracht Frankfurt archives 

1939 births
2019 deaths
People from Dragaš
Gorani people
Yugoslav footballers
Association football defenders
Yugoslav First League players
FK Partizan players
Bundesliga players
Eintracht Frankfurt players
Yugoslavia international footballers
1962 FIFA World Cup players
1960 European Nations' Cup players
Footballers at the 1960 Summer Olympics
Olympic footballers of Yugoslavia
Olympic gold medalists for Yugoslavia
Yugoslav expatriate footballers
Expatriate footballers in West Germany
Expatriate footballers in Germany
Yugoslav football managers
Yugoslav expatriate football managers
FC Schalke 04 managers
TSV 1860 Munich managers
FK Partizan managers
NK Čelik Zenica managers
Olympic medalists in football
Yugoslav expatriate sportspeople in West Germany
Medalists at the 1960 Summer Olympics
Yugoslav expatriate sportspeople in Austria
Expatriate footballers in Austria